XOXO is the eleventh studio album by the alt country band the Jayhawks, released on July 10, 2020. The album is dedicated to Ed Ackerson.

Background
The Jayhawks recorded XOXO in 2020 with the group line-up of Gary Louris, Marc Perlman, Karen Grotberg, and Tim O'Regan after John Jackson left as a full time member. John Jackson is credited as on the album as is another former member, Stephen McCarthy. Longtime alt-country mainstay and frequent Jayhawks contributor Eric Heywood adds pedal steel to two tracks and engineer Kris Johnson plays guitar on one. This is the first Jayhawks album to with sole writing credits for each member as well as the first to feature each as a lead vocalist.

Track listing
"This Forgotten Town" (Gary Louris, Tim O'Reagan, Marc Perlman) – 3:48
"Dogtown Days" (O'Reagan) – 3:17
"Living in a Bubble" (Louris) – 3:05
"Ruby" (Karen Grotberg) – 3:39
"Homecoming" (Louris) – 4:06
"Society Pages" (O'Reagan) – 4:38
"Illuminate" (Louris, O'Reagan, Perlman) – 4:35
"Bitter Pill" (Grotberg, Louris, O'Reagan) – 3:25
"Across My Field" (Grotberg) – 4:55
"Little Victories" (Louris, O'Reagan) – 3:47
"Down to the Farm" (Perlman) – 3:28
"Looking Up Your Number" (O'Reagan) – 3:43
Bonus tracks (only available on the first pressings of the CD and LP releases)
"Jewel of the Trimbelle" (Grotberg) – 3:41
"Then You Walked Away" (Louris) – 3:14
"Hypocrite's Lament" (Perlman, Louris) – 3:28

Personnel
The Jayhawks
Karen Grotberg – keyboards, vocals
Gary Louris – guitars, mellotron, vocals
Marc Perlman – bass, guitars, harmonica, vocals
Tim O'Reagan – drums, percussion, guitar, sitar, vocals

Additional musicians
Stephen McCarthy – electric guitar on "Bitter Pill" and pedal steel on "This Forgotten Town"
Eric Heywood – pedal steel on "Across My Field" and "Ruby"
John Jackson – violin on "Across My Field" and mandolin on "Living in a Bubble", "Bitter Pill" and "Down to the Farm"
Kris Johnson – electric guitar on "Ruby"

Production
The Jayhawks – producers
Gary Louris – executive producer
Paul Q. Kolderie – mixing
Pete Weiss – mastering
Nick Veitbakk – engineer
Kris Johnson – engineer and mixing
Duncan Hannah – cover painting

Charts

References

The Jayhawks albums
2020 albums